The Sisson Dam is a hydroelectric dam built in the Canadian province of New Brunswick and is operated by NB Power corporation. Its power house has a capacity of 9 megawatts with its single turbine. It is located at the southeast corner of the Sisson Branch Reservoir, which it created, in Lorne Parish, Victoria County.

References

External links

NB Power Corporation

Buildings and structures in Victoria County, New Brunswick
NB Power
Dams in New Brunswick
Hydroelectric power stations in New Brunswick